The 2022 season is the San Jose Earthquakes' 40th year of existence, their 24th season in Major League Soccer and their 14th consecutive season in the top-flight of American soccer.

Roster

Transfers

In

Out

Competitions

Major League Soccer

Standings

Match results

U.S. Open Cup

References

San Jose Earthquakes seasons
San Jose Earthquakes
San Jose Earthquakes
San Jose Earthquakes